The  is a Commuter Limited Express train operated by West Japan Railway Company (JR West) between Osaka Station and Himeji Station, on the JR Kobe Line (Tōkaidō Main Line, San'yō Main Line).

Summary 
This Commuter Limited Express train operates during weekday mornings and evenings. With the introduction of this train, Limited Express trains between 6pm and 8pm from Osaka to Himeji now operate at 1 hour intervals. The total travel time of the Rakuraku Harima is about an hour, which is 5 to 10 minutes faster than a Special Rapid train. J-WEST Card holders can enjoy a discount on the Limited Express charge with the "J-WEST Ticketless" service.

As a Limited Express train, it is similar to the Biwako Express and the Haruka, that they all operate within JR West's "Urban Network" metropolitan area. It is also the first Limited Express train to be introduced to the Kinki Region in 16 years, ever since the debut of the Biwako Express in 2003.

Service pattern 
The train operates only on weekdays. One eastbound train from Himeji to Osaka is operated in the morning rush hours, and one westbound train from Osaka to Himeji is operated in the evening rush hours.

Stations served 
 ー  ー  ー  ー  ー  ー 

 The Hamakaze No. 5 and the Super Hakuto No. 13, which run ahead and behind the evening Rakuraku Harima respectively, now adapt the same stopping pattern as the Rakuraku Harima.

Rolling stock 

 289 series 6-car sets (based in the Suita Depot).
 Car 1 is at the Himeji-end, while Car 6 is at the Osaka-end.
 Sockets are located at the front and rear end of each car, and all seats in the green car.

History 

 30 November 2018: Officially announces that services will begin in Spring 2019, along with daily operation frequency, stations served, rolling stock and limited express charge
 14 December 2018: Officially announces date of first service and its timetables

 18 March 2019: Operation commences

References 
This article incorporates material from the corresponding article in the Japanese Wikipedia.

External links 
 JR West's official website for the Rakuraku Harima 

Named passenger trains of Japan
West Japan Railway Company
Tōkaidō Main Line
Sanyō Main Line
JR Kobe Line
Railway services introduced in 2019
2019 establishments in Japan